Serbian League West is a section of the Serbian League, Serbia's third football league. Teams from the western part of Serbia are in this section of the league. The other sections are Serbian League East, Serbian League Vojvodina, and Serbian League Belgrade. In the 2012-13 season 1st placed team gains promotion to the Serbian First League and the last two team get relegated the Zone League.

Teams
GFK Jasenica 1911
FK Bane
FK Krušik Valjevo
FK Mačva Šabac
FK Mladi Radnik
FK Pobeda Beloševac
FK Polet Ljubić
FK Partizan Bumbarevo Brdo
FK Radnički Stobex
FK Rudar Kostolac
FK Seljak Mihajlovac
FK Sloboda Čačak
Sloga Petrovac
FK Šumadija Aranđelovac
FK Vujić Voda
FK Železničar Lajkovac

League table

References

Serbian League West seasons
3
Serb